Douglas Ferrell should link here

F. Douglas Ferrell (February 21, 1915 – July 5, 1982) was a pastor and state legislator in California. He founded a church and served as a pastor in Los Angeles. He was a Democrat. He was the pastor of Tabernacle Faith Baptist Church. He served in the California Assembly from 1963 to December 1966.

He was born in Gonzales City, Texas. He graduated from the Los Angeles Theological Seminary.

See also
California's 55th State Assembly district

References

People from Gonzales, Texas
Baptists from California
Politicians from Los Angeles
Democratic Party members of the California State Assembly
20th-century Baptist ministers from the United States
20th-century American politicians
1982 deaths
1915 births